Sighişoara Medieval Festival or Festivalul Sighişoara medievală is a Romanian festival held on the last weekend of July in Sighişoara, Romania.

At the parting of the ways
Knights Market, Pilgrims Market, Mercenaries Square, Troubadours Square, Small Knights Square, officials Great Tribune, Columnist House, Blacksmith Tower, Craftsman Road, Singer and Actors Road, Ancestors Road, Witches Court, Comediant Road, Pilgrims Way, Gourmet Court, Court Fortress, Prisoners Corner.

External links 
 Official page
 The Medievala in pictures
 Presentation page
 Portalul Sighişoara 
 Sighişoara online (Romanian)

See also 
 Festivals in Romania
 Sighişoara

Sighișoara
Romanian traditions
Festivals in Romania
Tourist attractions in Mureș County
Summer events in Romania